ASKI Sport Hall is an indoor arena located in Ankara, Turkey. With a seating capacity for 6,000 people,
the arena hosted the 2008 Turkish basketball cup final eight in which local Türk Telekom B.K. won the trophy, and hosts high attendance matches of the team that regularly plays at Atatürk Sport Hall.

References

Sports venues in Ankara
Basketball venues in Turkey
Indoor arenas in Turkey